Friderike Elisabeth von Grabow (née von der Kettenburg; 1705 - 7 July 1779, Güstrow) was a German poet and private tutor.

Life
She was the daughter of Hans Friedrich von der Kettenburg, ambassador to the court of the Holy Roman Emperor in Vienna, where she grew up. She married the court official Friedrich Wilhelm von Grabow in Güstrow (then in the Duchy of Mecklenburg-Strelitz) but was widowed soon afterwards. In 1746, she was summoned by Duchess Elisabeth Albertine to be tutor to her two surviving daughters Christiane and Charlotte; the latter later married George III of the United Kingdom.

In 1753 she was accepted as a member of the Deutsche Gesellschaft zu Greifswald (Royal German Society of Greifswald). Her works included Freye Betrachtungen über die Psalmen Davids in Versen. (Free Reflections on the Psalms of David in Verse), published in Lübeck and Leipzig in 1752 with a foreword by Sabine Elisabeth Oelgard von Bassewitz. The British travel writer Thomas Nugent came to Gustrow in 1766 and was introduced to von Grabow by her cousin captain von Kettenburg. He described the meeting in Volume 2 of his 1768 book Travels through Germany:

External links

References 

1705 births
1779 deaths
18th-century German educators
German women poets
18th-century German poets
18th-century German women writers